Pööra is a village in Jõgeva Parish, Jõgeva County, Estonia.

As of 2011 Census, the settlement's population was 96.

Military commander Aleksander Tõnisson (1875–1941) was born in Pööra.

References

Villages in Jõgeva County
Kreis Dorpat